Joseph  Kriechbaumer (21 March 1819, Tegernsee- 2 May 1902), Munich was a German entomologist who specialised in  Hymenoptera especially Ichneumonidae.

A Doctor of Philosophy, Kriechbaumer was Kurator (Director) of the Munich Natural History Museum  (Zoologische Staatssammlung München). His son Anton Kriechbaumer (1849-1935) was also an entomologist.

References
Anonym 1902 [Kriechbaumer, J.]  Entomologist's Monthly Magazine (3) 38 288-289 .
Fowler, W. W. 1902 [Kriechbaumer, J.]  Trans. Ent. Soc. London 1902 LIX
Konow, F. W. 1902 [Kriechbaumer, J.]  Z. syst. Hymenopt. Dipterol. 2 273-275.
Kutzscher, C. & Taeger, A. 1998 Portraits und biographische Daten. In: Taeger, A. & Blank, S. M. 1998 (Hrsg.): Pflanzenwespen Deutschlands (Hymenoptera, Symphyta). Kommentierte Bestandsaufnahme. Goecke & Evers, Keltern.

1819 births
1902 deaths
German entomologists
Hymenopterists